Luis Stadlober (born 23 July 1991) is a former cross-country skier from Austria. He competed in the 2018 Winter Olympics. He announced his retirement from cross-country skiing in April 2019.

He is the son of Austrian cross-country skier Alois Stadlober and Austrian alpine skier Roswitha Steiner, and older brother of cross-country skier Teresa Stadlober.

Cross-country skiing results
All results are sourced from the International Ski Federation (FIS).

Olympic Games

World Championships

World Cup

Season standings

References

1991 births
Living people
Cross-country skiers at the 2018 Winter Olympics
Austrian male cross-country skiers
Olympic cross-country skiers of Austria
Competitors at the 2015 Winter Universiade
21st-century Austrian people